Rozay-en-Brie (literally Rozay in Brie) is a commune in the Seine-et-Marne department in the Île-de-France region in north-central France.

Demographics
Inhabitants of Rozay-en-Brie are called Rozéens.

Population

Notable people
 Claudine de Culam, (1585-1601) prosecuted and executed for bestiality
 Vladimir (Tikhonicky), (1873-1959) Eastern Orthodox archbishop and metropolitan
 Christian Jacob, (1959) politician
 Sébastien Japrisot, (1931-2003) author, screenwriter, director

See also
 Communes of the Seine-et-Marne department

References

External links

 

Communes of Seine-et-Marne